Xenakis is a Greek surname. Notable people with the surname include:

 Constantin Xenakis (1931–2020), Greek artist
 Françoise Xenakis (1930–2018), French novelist
 Iannis Xenakis (1922–2001), Greek composer and architect
 Thomas Xenakis (1875–1942), Greek gymnast

See also 
 Xenakis Ensemble, a Dutch ensemble dedicated to the performance of contemporary classical music
 Eleni Xenaki (born 1997), Greek water polo player

Greek-language surnames
Surnames